Rob "Bob" A. Valentine (born ) is a Scottish rugby union and professional rugby league footballer who played in the 1950s, 1960s and 1970s, and coached rugby league in the 1970s.

Background
Bob Valentine was born in Hawick, Scotland, and he worked as an electrician.

Playing career

International honours
Rob Valentine represented South of Scotland (RU) while at Hawick RFC, his last match being the 0–8 defeat by New Zealand in the 1963–64 New Zealand rugby union tour match at Mansfield Park, Hawick on Saturday 16 November 1963, and represented Other Nationalities (RL) while at Huddersfield, he played  in the 2–19 defeat by St. Helens at Knowsley Road, St. Helens on Wednesday 27 January 1965, to mark the switching-on of new floodlights.

County Cup Final appearances
Rob Valentine played left-, i.e. number 8, in Wakefield Trinity's 2–7 defeat by Leeds in the 1973–74 Yorkshire County Cup Final during the 1973–74 season at Headingley Rugby Stadium, Leeds on Saturday 20 October 1973.

Player's No.6 Trophy Final appearances
Rob Valentine played right-, i.e. number 12, and scored a try in Wakefield Trinity's 11–22 defeat by Halifax in the 1971–72 Player's No.6 Trophy Final during the 1971–72 season at Odsal Stadium, Bradford on Saturday 22 January 1972.

Club career
Rob Valentine transferred from Hawick RFC to Huddersfield in 1963 for a signing-on fee of £4,000 (based on increases in average earnings, this would be approximately £160,800 in 2016), he made his début for Wakefield Trinity during October 1970, he appears to have scored no drop-goals (or field-goals as they are currently known in Australasia), but prior to the 1974–75 season all goals, whether; conversions, penalties, or drop-goals, scored 2-points, consequently prior to this date drop-goals were often not explicitly documented, therefore '0' drop-goals may indicate drop-goals not recorded, rather than no drop-goals scored.

Genealogical information
Rob Valentine is the younger brother of the rugby union, and rugby league footballer; Dave Valentine, and the rugby union footballer; Alec Valentine.

References

External links
!Great Britain Statistics at englandrl.co.uk (statistics currently missing due to not having appeared for both Great Britain, and England)
Blast from the Past: 1963: It's Valentine's Day in mid-November!
Scotland Rugby League International Honours Board
Hawick Wanderers Internationalists
Hawick Linden Internationalists
Rugby league's Borders greats are honoured
We turn the clock back to November 1963 when the New Zealand All Blacks played the South of Scotland at Hawick’s Mansfield Park

1941 births
Living people
Great Britain national rugby league team players
Hawick Linden RFC players
Hawick RFC players
Huddersfield Giants players
Keighley Cougars captains
Keighley Cougars players
Other Nationalities rugby league team players
Rugby league locks
Rugby league players from Hawick
Rugby league second-rows
Rugby union flankers
Rugby union players from Hawick
Scottish rugby league coaches
Scottish rugby league players
Scottish rugby union players
South of Scotland District (rugby union) players
Wakefield Trinity players